Setia nicoleae is a species of minute sea snail, a marine gastropod mollusk or micromollusk in the family Rissoidae.

Description

Distribution

References

 Segers W., Swinnen F. & De Prins R., 2009. Marine Molluscs of Madeira. Snoeck Publishers, Heule, Belgium, 612 p.

Rissoidae
Gastropods described in 2009